The Kuwait men's national junior ice hockey team is the men's national under-20 ice hockey team of Kuwait. The team is controlled by the Kuwait Ice Hockey Association, a member of the International Ice Hockey Federation. The team made its international debut in December 2018 at the 2019 IIHF U20 Challenge Cup of Asia Division I tournament which it went on to finish fourth.

History
The Kuwait men's national junior ice hockey team debuted at the 2019 IIHF U20 Challenge Cup of Asia Division I tournament in Kuala Lumpur, Malaysia. Their opening game of the tournament was against Indonesia which they lost 3–10. Kuwait went to lose their other two games against Mongolia and Thailand, finishing the tournament in fourth. Their 0–25 loss to Thailand is currently their biggest loss in international competition. Ahmad Alsaegh was named the best goaltender by the IIHF Directorate and selected as the best Kuwaiti player of the tournament.

International competitions
2019 IIHF U20 Challenge Cup of Asia Division I. Finish: 4th

Players and personnel

Roster
From the team's most recent tournament

Team staff
From the team's most recent tournament
Head coach: Kamil Vavra
General manager: Ahmad Alajmi
General manager: Ahmad Alomran
Team leader: Ghunaim Alazmi
Equipment manager: Ramadan Abdelmeguid
Team staff: Ali Albehairi

References

External links
Kuwait Ice Hockey Association

Ice hockey in Kuwait
Junior national ice hockey teams
National ice hockey teams in Asia
National ice hockey teams in the Arab world
Ice hockey